Vishwa Madhwa Maha Parishat is a non-profit, religious and social organization founded in 1998 by Jagadguru Satyatma Tirtha.  It is based at the Uttaradi Matha near Bangalore, India. VMMP  is striving for more than two decades in the field of publishing the hitherto unpublished texts for the advancement of Sanskrit.  Having established units throughout the country, it is imparting Sanskrit education and pravachanas.

References

Bibliography

External links
Books published by VMMP
Official website of Vishwa Madhwa Maha Parishat

Yoga organizations
Spiritual retreats
Non-profit organisations based in India
Organisations based in Bangalore
Spiritual organizations
1998 establishments in Karnataka
Organizations established in 1998